The Czech Republic, also known as Czechia, has a wide network of diplomatic missions worldwide.

Excluded are honorary consulates and "Czech Centres", offices without diplomatic status responsible for promoting trade, tourism, and Czech culture abroad. On the other, the economic and cultural office in Taipei is included in this list, as it function's as Czechia's de facto embassy to Taiwan.

Current missions

Africa

Americas

Asia

Europe

Oceania

Multilateral organizations

Gallery

Closed missions

Africa

Americas

Asia

Europe

See also
 Foreign relations of the Czech Republic
 List of diplomatic missions in the Czech Republic
 Visa policy of the Schengen Area

Notes

External reference
 Foreign Ministry of the Czech Republic

References

 
Diplomatic missions
Czech